The Men's Super-G in the 2017 Alpine Skiing World Cup involved six events, including the finals in Aspen, Colorado (USA). Although Norwegian skier Aleksander Aamodt Kilde was the defending champion in the discipline, fellow Norwegian (and 2015 discipline champion) Kjetil Jansrud won the first three Super-G races of the season. With only six events in the discipline, Jansrud then clinched the season championship before the finals merely by finishing seventh in the fifth Super-G of the year in Kvitfjell, Norway.

The season was interrupted by the 2017 World Ski Championships, which were held from 6–20 February in St. Moritz, Switzerland. The men's Super-G was held on 8 February.

Standings

DNF = Did Not Finish
DSQ = Disqualified
DNS = Did Not Start

See also
 2017 Alpine Skiing World Cup – Men's summary rankings
 2017 Alpine Skiing World Cup – Men's Overall
 2017 Alpine Skiing World Cup – Men's Downhill
 2017 Alpine Skiing World Cup – Men's Giant Slalom
 2017 Alpine Skiing World Cup – Men's Slalom
 2017 Alpine Skiing World Cup – Men's Combined
 World Cup scoring system

References

External links
 Alpine Skiing at FIS website

Men's Super-G
FIS Alpine Ski World Cup men's Super-G discipline titles